Watson Farley & Williams is an international law firm based in London. The firm has over 500 attorneys and 15 offices.

History

From its beginnings in shipping and shipping finance in 1982, Watson Farley & Williams has developed a broader practice: Energy & Infrastructure, Maritime, Natural Resources, Real Estate and Transport. The firm is known for its client centric operations and consistent results in deals and litigation. It regularly advises large-scale clients in cross border matters. 

Expanding geographically with 14 offices in Europe, Asia and the USA, the most recent office openings were in Hong Kong (March 2012), Frankfurt (January 2013) and Dubai (September 2014).

Watson Farley & Williams opened an office in Hong Kong, in association with Lau, Leong & Co., in March 2012.

Watson Farley & Williams opened an office in Frankfurt in January 2013 with a regulatory team focusing on the energy, infrastructure and real estate sectors.

Watson Farley & Williams opened an office in Dubai, in September 2014.

Watson Farley & Williams announced in October 2015 that it had agreed an association and cooperation arrangement with Hanoi-based boutique firm LVN & Associates.

Key sectors
The firm provides advice in the following sectors:
 Energy & Infrastructure
 Maritime
 Natural resources
 Real estate 
 Transport

Key services
The firm provides the following services:
 Banking & Finance
 Capital Markets
 Construction
 Corporate
 Dispute Resolution
 Employment
 Mergers & Acquisitions
 Private Equity
 Regulatory, Public Law, Competition
 Tax

See also
List of largest UK law firms
List of largest European law firms

References

External links
Legal Week news on Watson Farley & Williams
The Lawyer news on Watson Farley & Williams
Chambers and Partners profile and rankings
Chambers Student Guide
Legal 500 profile and rankings

Law firms of the United Kingdom
Foreign law firms with offices in the United States
Law firms established in 1982
1982 establishments in the United Kingdom
Foreign law firms with offices in Hong Kong